The 2012 British Flat Jockeys Championship was the competition to find the winningmost jockey in Great Britain during the traditional flat racing season from the Lincoln Handicap meeting at Doncaster Racecourse in March until the November Handicap meeting at the same racecourse in November. It was won by Richard Hughes for the first time in his career.

Final table

References

Horse racing in Great Britain
2012 in horse racing